zpizza (originally called z pizza and commonly known as z) is a pizza franchise based in Newport Beach, California.

zpizza has locations in California,  Arizona, and Oregon. The menu includes pizza, salads, and sandwiches. zpizza's customers have the option of creating their own pizza from the provided "crusts, sauces, cheeses and toppings" on their menu.

History
zpizza was founded in Laguna Beach, California, in 1986 by Sid Fanarof. It is owned by Fanarof, Chris Bright, and Dan Rowe, the founders of Fransmart. Since then many new stores have opened in the country with the majority of them in the Bay Area, Los Angeles area, the Phoenix metro, and the Raleigh metro. zpizza started to franchise in 2000.

During the restaurant's inception in Laguna Beach, Fanarof and Suzi Megroz, his business partner, called it "the pizza place". Raised in France, Suzi pronounced the name with an accent, "zee pizza place". They had not yet chosen an official name for the restaurant, and Suzi's pronunciation inspired them to call it z pizza. As the business matured, the company omitted the space, officially naming it "zpizza" and occasionally calling it "z".

See also
 List of pizza franchises

References

External links
 Official website

Companies based in Newport Beach, California
Restaurants established in 1986
Pizza chains of the United States
Pizza franchises
Fast-food chains of the United States
Fast-food franchises
Regional restaurant chains in the United States
1986 establishments in California
American companies established in 1986